Tabernaemontana crassa is a plant in the dogbane family Apocynaceae, native to tropical Africa.

Description
Its fragrant flowers feature white to pale yellow corolla lobes.

Distribution and habitat
Tabernaemontana crassa is native to an area of tropical Africa from Sierra Leone east and south to Angola. Its habitat is forests or on coastlines from sea level to  altitude.

Uses
Tabernaemontana crassa is used in local traditional medicine as an anaesthetic, as a haemostatic, as an anthelmintic and in the treatment of rheumatism, kidney problems, rickets and conjunctivitis. It has also been used as arrow poison.

References

crassa
Plants described in 1849
Plants used in traditional African medicine
Flora of West Tropical Africa
Flora of West-Central Tropical Africa
Flora of Angola